Ivan Jorge (born November 7, 1980) is a Brazilian mixed martial artist currently competing in the Welterweight division. A professional competitor since 2001, he has competed for the UFC, Fight Nights Global, Jungle Fight and M-1 Global. He is the former Jungle Fight Lightweight Champion.

Mixed martial arts career

Early career
Jorge made his professional mixed martial arts debut in June 2001. During the first 11 years of his career he fought in his native Brazil, Russia, and Spain for a variety of promotions. He amassed a record of 18–3.

Jungle Fight
Jorge debuted for the Jungle Fight promotion early in his career in 2005.  He didn't return to the promotion until 2012, where he put together an impressive win streak and eventually became the Jungle Fight Lightweight champion.

Ultimate Fighting Championship
In August 2013, it was announced that Jorge had signed with the UFC.  He made his debut at UFC Fight Night 28 as a replacement for Marcelo Guimarães, winning a unanimous decision over Keith Wisniewski.

Jorge then lost a unanimous decision to Rodrigo Damm on February 15, 2014 at UFC Fight Night 36.

Jorge faced Josh Shockley on February 22, 2015 at UFC Fight Night 61.  Jorge won the fight via unanimous decision.

Jorge faced Joseph Duffy on July 18, 2015 at UFC Fight Night 72.  He lost the fight via submission in the first round and was subsequently released from the promotion.

EFN Global
Jorge faced Akhmed Aliev on April 22, 2016 at EFN: Fight Nights 45 - Global. He lost the fight via KO (punch) in the second round.

Mixed martial arts record

|-
|Loss
|align=center|27–8
| Paulo Bueno
| TKO (retirement)
| Aspera FC 55: Aspera Fighting Championship 55
| 
|align=center| 1
|align=center| 5:00
| Maringá, Brazil
| 
 |-
|Loss
|align=center|27–7
| Muslim Salikhov
| KO (spinning back kick)
| Kunlun Fight: Cage Fight Series 6
| 
|align=center| 1
|align=center| 1:00
| Yiwu, China
|Return to Welterweight.
|-
|Win
|align=center|27–6
|Guilherme Miranda
|Decision (unanimous)
|AFC 41: Road to KSW
|
|align=center|3
|align=center|5:00
|São José, Santa Catarina, Brazil
|
|-
|Loss
|align=center|26–6
|Akhmed Aliev
|KO (punch)
|Fight Nights Global 45: Galiev vs. Stepanyan
|
|align=center|2
|align=center|4:28
|Ufa, Bashkortostan, Russia
|
|-
|Loss
|align=center|26–5
|Joseph Duffy
|Submission (triangle choke)
|UFC Fight Night: Bisping vs. Leites
|
|align=center|1
|align=center|3:05
|Glasgow, Scotland
|
|-
| Win
| align=center| 26–4
| Josh Shockley
| Decision (unanimous)
| UFC Fight Night: Bigfoot vs. Mir
| 
| align=center| 3
| align=center| 5:00
| Porto Alegre, Brazil
| 
|-
| Loss
| align=center| 25–4
| Rodrigo Damm
| Decision (unanimous)
| UFC Fight Night: Machida vs. Mousasi
| 
| align=center| 3
| align=center| 5:00
| Jaraguá do Sul, Brazil
|Return to Lightweight.
|-
| Win
| align=center| 25–3
| Keith Wisniewski
| Decision (unanimous)
| UFC Fight Night: Teixeira vs. Bader
| 
| align=center| 3
| align=center| 5:00
| Belo Horizonte, Brazil
|Welterweight bout.
|-
| Win
| align=center| 24–3
| Lucio Abreu
| Submission (rear-naked choke)
| Jungle Fight 54
| 
| align=center| 1
| align=center| 2:10
| São Paulo, Brazil
| Won the Jungle Fight Lightweight Championship.
|-
| Win
| align=center| 23–3
| Lindeclecio Oliveira
| Submission (rear-naked choke)
| Jungle Fight 48
| 
| align=center| 1
| align=center| 3:35
| São Paulo, Brazil
| 
|-
| Win
| align=center| 22–3
| Geovane Salviano
| Submission (guillotine choke)
| Jungle Fight 42
| 
| align=center| 1
| align=center| 1:35
| São Paulo, Brazil
| 
|-
| Win
| align=center| 21–3
| Ermesson Queiroz
| Submission (rear-naked choke)
| Heroes 2
| 
| align=center| 1
| align=center| 1:14
| São José, Brazil
| 
|-
| Win
| align=center| 20–3
| Ary Santos
| Submission (rear-naked choke)
| Jungle Fight 37
| 
| align=center| 2
| align=center| 4:28
| São Paulo, Brazil
| 
|-
| Win
| align=center| 19–3
| Rodrigo Cavalheiro 
| Submission (arm-triangle choke)
| Floripa Fight 8
| 
| align=center| 2
| align=center| N/A
| Florianópolis, Brazil
| 
|-
| Loss
| align=center| 18–3
| André Santos
| Decision (unanimous)
| Bitetti Combat 10
| 
| align=center| 3
| align=center| 5:00
| Rio de Janeiro, Brazil
| 
|-
| Win
| align=center| 18–2
| Cristian Ziemer
| Submission (punches)
| Sao Jose Super Fight 1
| 
| align=center| 1
| align=center| 0:16
| São José, Brazil
| 
|-
| Win
| align=center| 17–2
| Vanderlei Fernandes
| Submission (guillotine choke)
| Black Trunk Fight 2
| 
| align=center| 1
| align=center| 1:36
| Florianópolis, Brazil
| 
|-
| Win
| align=center| 16–2
| Fabiano Killer
| Submission (rear-naked choke)
| Floripa Fight 7
| 
| align=center| 1
| align=center| 1:12
| Florianópolis, Brazil
| 
|-
| Win
| align=center| 15–2
| Marco Castanheira
| Submission (anaconda choke)
| Nitrix Champion Fight 6
| 
| align=center| 1
| align=center| 4:32
| Brusque, Brazil
| 
|-
| Loss
| align=center| 14–2
| Luís Santos
| KO (knee)
| Amazon Fight 5
| 
| align=center| 1
| align=center| 0:52
| Belém, Brazil
|Welterweight bout.
|-
| Win
| align=center| 14–1
| Luis Sergio Melo Jr.
| Decision (unanimous)
| Platinum Fight Brazil 3
| 
| align=center| 3
| align=center| 5:00
| São Paulo, Brazil
| 
|-
| Win
| align=center| 13–1
| Daniel Acácio
| Decision (unanimous)
| Floripa Fight 6
| 
| align=center| 3
| align=center| 5:00
| Florianópolis, Brazil
| 
|-
| Win
| align=center| 12–1
| Mario Sartori
| Decision (unanimous)
| Warrior's Challenge 4
| 
| align=center| 3
| align=center| 5:00
| Porto Belo, Brazil
| 
|-
| Loss
| align=center| 11–1
| Yuri Ivlev
| TKO (punches)
| M-1 Challenge 20: 2009 Finals
| 
| align=center| 2
| align=center| 4:11
| Rio de Janeiro, Brazil
| 
|-
| Win
| align=center| 11–0
| Kaue Dudus
| TKO (punches)
| Nitrix Show Fight 3
| 
| align=center| 2
| align=center| 4:43
| Itajaí, Brazil
| 
|-
| Win
| align=center| 10–0
| Steve Magdaleno
| Decision (unanimous)
| M-1 Challenge 19: 2009 Semifinals
| 
| align=center| 3
| align=center| 5:00
| Rostov Oblast, Russia
|Lightweight debut.
|-
| Win
| align=center| 9–0
| Jadyson Costa
| KO (punches)
| Blackout FC 3
| 
| align=center| 1
| align=center| N/A
| Balneario Camboriú, Brazil
| 
|-
| Win
| align=center| 8–0
| Rodrigo Freitas
| Decision (split)
| WFC Pozil Challenge
| 
| align=center| 3
| align=center| 5:00
| Gramado, Brazil
| 
|-
| Win
| align=center| 7–0
| Arymarcel Santos
| TKO (doctor stoppage)
| Nitrix Show Fight 2
| 
| align=center| 2
| align=center| 5:00
| Joinville, Brazil
| 
|-
| Win
| align=center| 6–0
| Valdir Linhares
| Submission (guillotine choke)
| Hombres de Honor 7
| 
| align=center| 1
| align=center| 4:16
| Barcelona, Spain
| 
|-
| Win
| align=center| 5–0
| Andrius Hubaldo
| Decision
| Jungle Fight 5
| 
| align=center| 3
| align=center| 5:00
| Manaus, Brazil
| 
|-
| Win
| align=center| 4–0
| Fabio Tigrão
| Submission (rear-naked choke)
| Shooto Brazil Never Shake
| 
| align=center| 3
| align=center| N/A
| Sao Paulo, Brazil
| 
|-
| Win
| align=center| 3–0
| Alexandre Barros
| Decision (unanimous)
| Meca World Vale Tudo 11
| 
| align=center| 3
| align=center| 5:00
| Rio de Janeiro, Brazil
| 
|-
| Win
| align=center| 2–0
| Rafael Freitas
| Decision (split)
| Meca World Vale Tudo 9
| 
| align=center| 3
| align=center| 5:00
| Rio de Janeiro, Brazil
| 
|-
| Win
| align=center| 1–0
| Carlos Baruch
| Submission (guillotine choke)
| Heroes 2
| 
| align=center| 1
| align=center| N/A
| Rio de Janeiro, Brazil
|

See also
 List of current UFC fighters
 List of male mixed martial artists

References

External links
 
 

Brazilian male mixed martial artists
1980 births
Lightweight mixed martial artists
Mixed martial artists utilizing Brazilian jiu-jitsu
Mixed martial artists utilizing Luta Livre
Living people
Ultimate Fighting Championship male fighters
Brazilian practitioners of Brazilian jiu-jitsu
People awarded a black belt in Brazilian jiu-jitsu
Sportspeople from Florianópolis